John Ramsey Bronk (December 20, 1929 – December 31, 2007) was an American biologist, specialising in the study of intestinal transport.

Bronk graduated from Princeton University in 1952, and then undertook a Rhodes Scholarship at Oriel College, Oxford University, conducting research under the supervision of Dr R B Fisher. He obtained his DPhil in biochemistry in June  1955.

Bronk then worked for the National Institutes of Health as a research scientist until 1958. In 1958 he joined the academic staff of the Department of Zoology at Columbia University, spending the 1964–1965 academic year as a Guggenheim Fellow at Oxford, under Dr D S Parsons. In 1966 Bronk became the first Professor of Biochemistry at the University of York, becoming Emeritus in 1997. He died on December 31, 2007, in Oxford.

References

External links 

 

1929 births
2007 deaths
Place of birth missing
American Rhodes Scholars
Alumni of Oriel College, Oxford
National Institutes of Health people
Columbia University faculty
Academics of the University of York
Princeton University alumni
American biochemists